The Peter Kugel House, also known as the Kugel-Gips House, is a historic house at 188 Way 626, Wellfleet, Massachusetts, in Cape Cod National Seashore.  It is one of a modest number of surviving houses in Wellfleet that combine elements of Modern architecture with traditional Cape Cod architecture.  This house was built in 1970 to a design by architect Charlie Zehnder, who took his design inspiration for it from the Fallingwater estate designed by Frank Lloyd Wright.

The house was listed on the National Register of Historic Places in 2014.

See also
National Register of Historic Places listings in Barnstable County, Massachusetts
National Register of Historic Places listings in Cape Cod National Seashore

References

Houses in Barnstable County, Massachusetts
Wellfleet, Massachusetts
National Register of Historic Places in Cape Cod National Seashore
Modernist architecture in Massachusetts
Houses on the National Register of Historic Places in Barnstable County, Massachusetts
Houses completed in 1970